Mac Miller and the Most Dope Family is an American reality documentary television series on MTV2. The six episode series premiered on February 26, 2013 at 11:30/10:30c. Mac Miller and the Most Dope Family was then renewed for a second season, which premiered on July 23, 2014 and ended on September 3, 2014.

Premise
The series encompasses Mac Miller as he settles into his new-found life in Los Angeles, California and creates his newest album, Watching Movies with the Sound Off. Even though he left Pittsburgh, Miller brought his four closest friends with him to California to enjoy his new mansion and create fresh adventures.

Main cast
 Mac Miller
 Big Dave — Big Dave was born in Tallahassee, Florida. He met Mac while attending one of his concerts, and is now his bodyguard.
 Jimmy — Jimmy and Mac met at age six. He is known for his artistry with tattoos and graffiti. Jimmy appears in various Mac Miller music videos.
 Peanut — Peanut is another Pittsburgh native. He and Mac met through a mutual friend years back. Like Jimmy, Peanut also appears in some Mac Miller music videos. Peanut was not in Season 2, due to him moving out of the Mansion.
 Quentin — Quentin, also known simply as Q, is Miller's business partner. He is working with Mac to launch the REMember record label. Q also appears in some Mac Miller videos.
 ClockworkDJ - Clock, is Mac's longtime friend, and on-stage DJ. Clock will make numerous appearances on season 2.
 Chelsea - Chelsea, is Mac's longtime friend, and business manager. Chelsea, like Clock will make numerous appearances on season 2.

Episodes

Season 1: 2013

Season 2: 2014

References

2013 American television series debuts
2010s American reality television series
Television series based on singers and musicians
MTV2 original programming
English-language television shows